Rampo may refer to:

Edogawa Rampo, Japanese writer
Rampo (aka The Mystery of Rampo), a 1994 Japanese film inspired by the works of Edogawa Rampo
 Rampó or Rampon, Count of Barcelona